The 2021 Queensland Cup season was the 26th season of Queensland's top-level statewide rugby league competition run by the Queensland Rugby League. The 2021 season saw the return of the competition, after it was cancelled after just one round in 2020, due to the COVID-19 pandemic. The Queensland Cup was to be played over 19 rounds in 2021, but due to restrictions and difficulties caused by the COVID-19 pandemic in Queensland, has been reduced to 18 rounds, with the finals delayed into October.

Teams
In 2021, the line-up of teams remains unchanged for the seventh consecutive season. On 4 September 2020, the Easts Tigers announced that they would be rebranding and playing as the Brisbane Tigers from the 2021 season onward.

The 2021 season is the first in the partnership between the Redcliffe Dolphins and New Zealand Warriors. The Dolphins had been affiliated with the Brisbane Broncos since 2006. The Warriors affiliation with the Dolphins is their first in the Queensland Cup since their partnership with the Souths Magpies in the 2000 season.

Due to the COVID-19 pandemic, the PNG Hunters are based out of the Gold Coast for the 2021 season, playing their home games at Runaway Bay's Bycroft Oval.

Ladder

Final series

Grand Final

First half

Second half

QRL awards
 Petero Civoniceva Medal (Best and Fairest): Jayden Berrell ( Wynnum Manly Seagulls)
 Coach of the Year: Rohan Smith ( Norths Devils)
 Rookie of the Year: Ezra Mam ( Souths Logan Magpies)

Team of the Year

See also

 Queensland Cup
 Queensland Rugby League

References

2021 in Australian rugby league
Queensland Cup